Eduard Mykolayovych Tsykhmeystruk (born 24 June 1973) is a former Ukrainian professional footballer.

Club career
He made his professional debut in the Soviet Second League B in 1991 for FC Vahonobudivnyk Stakhanov. He played 6 games in the 2001–02 UEFA Champions League for FC Spartak Moscow.

Honours
 Bulgarian A Professional Football Group champion: 2001.
 Russian Premier League champion: 2001.
 Russian Premier League bronze: 2002.
 Russian Cup winner: 2003 (played in the early stages of the 2002/03 tournament for FC Spartak Moscow).
 Ukrainian Premier League bronze: 2003.

References

External links
 

1973 births
Living people
Sportspeople from Makiivka
Ukrainian footballers
Ukrainian expatriate footballers
Expatriate footballers in Bulgaria
Expatriate footballers in Russia
Ukraine international footballers
FC Shakhtar Stakhanov players
FC Shakhtar Shakhtarsk players
FC Metalurh Donetsk players
FC Antratsyt Kirovske players
FC Elektron Romny players
FC Arsenal Kyiv players
PFC Levski Sofia players
FC Nyva Vinnytsia players
FC Spartak Moscow players
FC Mariupol players
FC Zorya Luhansk players
FC Vorskla Poltava players
FC Makiyivvuhillya Makiyivka players
FC Irpin Horenychi players
FC Yednist Plysky players
Russian Premier League players
Ukrainian Premier League players
First Professional Football League (Bulgaria) players
Association football midfielders
Ukrainian expatriate sportspeople in Bulgaria
Ukrainian expatriate sportspeople in Russia